The Congressional Addiction, Treatment, and Recovery Caucus is bi-partisan caucus of the United States House of Representatives established in 2004 by Rep. Jim Ramstad.  The Caucus is currently co-chaired by Rep. Tim Ryan (D-OH) and Rep. John Fleming (R-LA).

According to the Caucus' webpage, its mission  is:

Current Membership

See also 
Caucuses of the United States Congress

References

External links 
 Congressional Addiction, Treatment, and Recovery Home Page
 Faces and Voices of Recovery
 Canadian Health Recovery Centre - Alcohol & Drug Rehab Treatment

Drug rehabilitation
Drugs in the United States